Point of use water filters are used in individual houses or offices to provide filtration of potable water close to the point of consumption. The related topic, Point of use water treatment describes full-scale water treatment options and technologies designed to serve communities when municipal water treatment fails or is unavailable.

Probably the best known POU water filters are those installed in the plumbing in kitchens just prior to the tap and also jug filters where water is passed through a filter in a specially constructed plastic jug.

Such filters are typically based on ion exchange resins designed to remove Calcium ions to reduce water hardness and removing any Toxic heavy metal ions such as Lead. Many filters also incorporate activated charcoal to eliminate excess Chlorine and to reduce unwanted tastes and odours. They may also be effective in reducing concentrations of halogenated organic species that can be created through the halogenation of organic rich waters as part of the disinfection process at the municipal water treatment facility.

Filters incorporating reverse osmosis are also available and can be effective in removing many pathogenic organisms.

Point of use filters have limited capacity to modify water chemistry and typically require that treatment cartridges are replaced at regular intervals, especially in hard water areas.

Benefits
POU filters are generally efficient at softening hard water and reducing lime scale in kitchen utensils, on shower heads and reducing water smear on shower enclosures provided that the treatment cartridges are regularly replaced.

They can also be efficient in removing heavy metal ions where these are present. However, modern municipal water treatment and modern plumbing standards mean that toxic metals concentrations are very rarely a significant issue. Even where such ions are detectable, they may be at concentrations below the effective treatment range of the filter

Limitations
Although the technology in POU filters is generally robust, the limited contact time with the water stream and the technological limitations of the devices mean that the level of performance is not as great as the user may expect. Per- and Polyfluoroalkyl substances PFAs may occur in some water supplies because of contamination of the water catchment. but a number of POU filters only offer a reduction of concentration down to 70 ng/l whereas the limit on municipal water treatment plant may be as low as 20 ng/l. In such cases the POU filter will be of no benefit.

Disadvantages

Certification in the United States
Three organizations are accredited by the American National Standards Institute, and each one of them certified products using American National Standard Institute/National Science Foundation standards. Each American National Standards Institute/National Science Foundation standard requires verification of contaminant reduction performance claims, an evaluation of the unit, including its materials and structural integrity, and a review of the product labels and sales literature. Each certifies that home water treatment units meet or exceed National Standard Institute/National Science Foundation and Environmental Protection Agency drinking water standards. American National Standard Institute/National Science Foundation standards are issued in two different sets, one for health concerns (such as removal of specific contaminants (Standard 53, Health Effects) and one for aesthetic concerns (Aesthetic Effects, such as improving taste or appearance of water). Certification from these organizations will specify one or both of these specific standards.

NSF International
NSF International as it is now known started out as the National Sanitation Foundation in 1944 at the  University of Michigan School of Public Health. The NSF's water treatment Device Certification Program requires extensive product testing and unannounced audits of production facilities. One goal of this not for profit organization is to provide assurance to consumers that the water treatment devices they are purchasing meet the design, material, and performance requirements of national standards.

Underwriters Laboratories
Underwriters Laboratories, Inc., is an independent, accredited testing and certification organization that certifies home water treatment units which meet or exceed EPA and American National Standard Institute/National Science Foundation drinking water standards of contaminant reduction, aesthetic concerns, structural integrity, and materials safety.

Water Quality Association
The Water Quality Association is a trade organization that tests water treatment equipment, and awards its Gold Seal to systems that meet or exceed ANSI/NSF standards for contaminant reduction performance, structural integrity, and materials safety.
	
Filters that use reverse osmosis, those labeled as “absolute one micron filters,” or those labeled as certified by an American National Standards Institute (ANSI)- accredited organization to American National Standard Institute/National Science Foundation Standard 53 for “Cyst Removal” provide the greatest assurance of removing Cryptosporidium. As with all filters, follow the manufacturer's instructions for filter use and replacement.

References

Water treatment